Koza Plaza, located in the Esenler district of Istanbul, is Europe's largest wholesale retail facility of textiles.

See also
 Istanbul
 List of tallest buildings in Istanbul
List of tallest buildings in Turkey
List of tallest buildings in Europe

External links
 Emporis Buildings Database - Tekstilkent Plaza

Buildings and structures in Istanbul
Commercial buildings completed in 2000
Skyscraper office buildings in Turkey
Esenler